Ann Agnes Bernatitus (21 January 1912 – 3 March 2003) was a United States Navy nurse who served during World War II. She was the first American recipient of the Legion of Merit.

Career
Ann Bernatitus was appointed as Ensign in the Navy Nurse Corps in 1936, after graduating from the Wyoming Valley Homeopathic Hospital Training School in Wilkes-Barre, Pennsylvania, in 1934, and the University of Pennsylvania's Graduate Hospital post-graduate program in operating room nursing in 1935. Bernatitus's first assignments with the Navy were as a staff nurse at the Naval Hospitals in Chelsea, Massachusetts and Annapolis, Maryland.

In 1940, she was assigned duty on board the  before assignment to the US Naval Hospital at Canacao, Philippines Islands in July 1940. After the attack on Pearl Harbor and start of the Japanese war in the Pacific, Canacoa Hospital staff and patients were evacuated to Manila and Bataan under US Army supervision. As the lone Navy nurse on her team, Bernatitus treated American, Filipino, and Japanese wounded from the Japanese siege between December and April.

In October 1942, she became the first American recipient of the Legion of Merit for her heroism during the siege of Bataan and Corregidor from December 1941 through April 1942.

She was among the last group of the "Angels of Bataan" to be evacuated from the Philippines just prior to the fall of Corregidor aboard  and was the only Navy nurse stationed there to evade capture. She served at Bethesda Naval Hospital, New Orleans, Naval Hospital Great Lakes, and San Francisco, then in 1945, as Chief of Nursing Service aboard the hospital ship  during the Okinawa campaign.

She was promoted to the rank of Commander on 1 August 1950, and retired from the United States Navy Nurse Corps as a Captain in 1959.

She died at Wilkes-Barre General Hospital, Wilkes-Barre, Pennsylvania on 3 March 2003, and was interred at St. Casimir's Cemetery Pittston, Luzerne County, Pennsylvania.

Legacy
Captain Bernatitus donated her Legion of Merit medal to the Smithsonian Institution in 1976.

A monument in her honor was dedicated 23 June 2007, at the Exeter Borough Building in her home town.

Awards
Legion of Merit with "V" device
American Defense Service Medal with "BASE" clasp
American Campaign Medal
Asiatic-Pacific Campaign Medal with one battle star
World War II Victory Medal
National Defense Service Medal

Legion of Merit Citation
The President of the United States of America takes pleasure in presenting the Legion of Merit with Combat "V" to

For exceptionally meritorious conduct in the performance of outstanding services to the Government of the United States as a member of Surgical Unit No. 5 during the Japanese attack on the Philippines, December 1941 through April 1942. Nurse Bernatitus maintained her position in the front lines of the Manila-Bataan area rendering efficient and devoted service during the prolonged siege. Miss Bernatitus was regularly attached to the Naval Hospital, Canacao, Philippine Islands having reported for duty there on 20 July 1941. Shortly after hostilities commenced in December 1941 the Naval Hospital Staff and patients were moved to a new establishment in Manila. On 24 December 1941, when Manila was being evacuated Miss Bernatitus accompanied by two Navy Medical Officers proceeded to the Army Hospital at Limay, Bataan. The remainder of the hospital staff stayed in Manila and were taken prisoners. On 25 January 1942, Miss Bernatitus was transferred to Army Field Hospital No. 1 at Little Baguio, Bataan and remained there on active duty until that hospital was destroyed by enemy bombing on 7 April. When Bataan fell Miss Bernatitus was transferred to Corregidor. During her stay in Bataan she worked directly under Lieutenant Commander C. M. Smith (MC), USN, who is now a prisoner of war. The conditions under which the nurses lived and worked lacked everything in the way of comfort. They were constantly exposed to enemy bombing attacks and experienced several as well as the endemic jungle diseases of that area. Miss Bernatitus suffered from both dysentery and beriberi during her tour of duty in Bataan. In spite of all difficulties Miss Bernatitus performed her duty in an exemplary manner with courage and good spirit. She was officially transferred from Corregidor three days before the surrender of that fortress. (Lieutenant, Junior Grade, Bernatitus is authorized to wear the Combat "V".)

References

Bibliography

External links

Oral Histories – United States Navy Nurse in the Pacific Theater during World War II – Recollections of CAPT Ann Bernatitus, NC, USN, (Ret.)
Home of the Heroes – Lieutenant (j.g.) Ann A. Bernatitus "Angel of Mercy"
Navy Art Collection – Women in Uniform

1912 births
2003 deaths
People from Exeter, Pennsylvania
Female United States Navy nurses in World War II
Female United States Navy officers
Female wartime nurses
American expatriates in the Philippines
Recipients of the Legion of Merit
United States Navy Nurse Corps officers
United States Navy captains
21st-century American women
Military personnel from Pennsylvania